Jaroslav Košnar (17 August 1930 – 21 April 1985) was a Slovak football player. He played for Czechoslovakia, for which he played two matches.

He was a participant at the 1954 FIFA World Cup.

References

1930 births
1985 deaths
Slovak footballers
Czechoslovak footballers
1954 FIFA World Cup players
Czechoslovakia international footballers
FK Inter Bratislava players
Association football forwards